Trypetoptera punctulata  is a species of fly in the family Sciomyzidae. It is found in the  Palearctic.Unlike most  Sciomyzids, it is found in dry habitats, especially calcareous woodlands and also on grassland and along the edges of streams  The larva preys on Helicidae.

References

External links
Images representing Trypetoptera punctulata  at BOLD

Sciomyzidae
Insects described in 1763
Diptera of Europe
Taxa named by Giovanni Antonio Scopoli